Clements Gap is a locality in South Australia's Mid North. The name is a reference to the co-located pass through the north end of the Barunga Range. The Clements Gap pass in turn is thought to be named after a shepherd in the area prior to 1880, per research by local historian Rodney Cockburn.

The Clements Gap school was opened in 1880 by John Wauchope and closed in 1942.

See also
 Clements Gap Conservation Park
 Clements Gap Wind Farm
 List of cities and towns in South Australia

References

External links
 
 

Towns in South Australia